Abronia juarezi, also known as the Sierra Juarez alligator lizard, is a species of lizard in the family Anguidae. The species is endemic to Sierra de Juarez in Oaxaca, Mexico.

References

Abronia
Lizards of North America
Endemic reptiles of Mexico
Reptiles described in 1987